Palline is a genus of small air-breathing land snails, terrestrial pulmonate gastropod mollusks in the family Charopidae.

Species
Species within the genus Palline include:
 Palline micramyla
 Palline notera

References

 Nomenclator Zoologicus info

 
Fauna of Micronesia
Gastropod genera
Molluscs of Oceania
Molluscs of the Pacific Ocean
Charopidae
Taxonomy articles created by Polbot